William Owen  (born 1862) was a Welsh international footballer. He was part of the Wales national football team between 1884 and 1893, playing 16 matches and scoring 5 goals. He played his first match on 17 March 1884 against England  and his last match on 8 April 1893 against Ireland. At club level he played for Chirk.

See also
 List of Wales international footballers (alphabetical)

References

1862 births
Place of birth missing

Date of death missing

Year of death missing
Welsh footballers

Wales international footballers
Association footballers not categorized by position
Chirk AAA F.C. players